Ivan Pochekin (born 1987 in Moscow) is a Russian violinist, who won first prize in the 2005 Third Paganini Moscow International Violin Competition. He won second place in the 8th International Vaclav Huml Violin Competition.

Notes

1987 births
Living people
Russian violinists
Male violinists
21st-century violinists
21st-century Russian male musicians